DYKB-TV, channel 8, is a television station of Radio Philippines Network. Its studios and transmitter are located at Purok KBS, Pta. Taytay Road, Sum-ag, Bacolod.

RPN TV-8 Bacolod currently programs
Newsroom Negros

RPN TV-8 Bacolod previously aired programs
NewsWatch Negros

Area of coverage

Primary areas
Bacolod
Negros Occidental

Secondary areas
Portion of Iloilo
Portion of Iloilo City
Portion of Guimaras

See also
Solar News Channel
Radio Philippines Network
List of Radio Philippines Network affiliate stations

Television stations in Bacolod
Radio Philippines Network stations
Television channels and stations established in 1961